Max Jules Gottschalk (1909–2005) was an artist, furniture designer, and industrial designer.

History
Gottschalk was born in 1909 in St. Louis, Missouri.  He graduated from Washington University in St. Louis in the late 1930s.

Newfoundland
Afterwards, he moved to the Dominion of Newfoundland where he worked as Chief Technical Advisor of the Department of Agriculture and Rural Reconstruction. The Newfoundland government assigned him the task of designing workshop furniture for the agricultural community of Markland.  His designs combined modernist principles with the use of natural materials. The onset World War II ended the government's economic reconstruction programs and Gottschalk’s work.

Arizona
Gottschalk then returned to the United States, moving to Tucson, Arizona. He became a professor of industrial design at the new Modernist style West Campus of Pima Community College.

Gottschalk's most productive artistic period was in Arizona, from the 1950s to his death in 2005.

His artistic interests included mid-century modern industrial design which combined "natural" materials like leather with production materials such as aluminum and steel.  The result was beautifully proportioned work that embraced and embodied both the Southwestern aesthetic and Modern design principles.

Gottschalk often worked with leather that was irregular and flawed, celebrating the material's imperfections. His distinctive logo appears on all of his products.  He also created oil paintings.

Gallery
Examples of Gottschalk's work include:

See also
 Gottschalks – Former American department store chain

References
 Donald Wilcox, Modern Leather Design, Watson Guptill, New York, 1982.

External links
 AskArt: Max Gottschalk

American industrial designers
American furniture designers
Modern artists
1909 births
2005 deaths
Artists from Tucson, Arizona
Educators from Arizona
Artists from St. Louis
Modernist architecture in Arizona
Educators from Missouri
Sam Fox School of Design & Visual Arts alumni